Achaemenes is the supposed founder of the first Persian dynasty

Achaemenes may also refer to:

Achaemenes (satrap), the satrap of Egypt from 484 BC until his death in 460 BC

See also
Achaemenides, a minor fictional character in Virgil's Aeneid